South Bank busway station is located in Brisbane, Australia serving the suburb of South Brisbane. It opened on 23 October 2000 when the South East Busway opened from the Cultural Centre to Woolloongabba.

It is served by 36 routes operated by Brisbane Transport and Clarks Logan City Bus Service as part of the TransLink network.

Transport links
South Bank railway station is located adjacent to the busway station.

References

External links
[ South Bank station] TransLink

Bus stations in Brisbane
South Brisbane, Queensland
Transport infrastructure completed in 2000